New Facts Emerge is the 31st and final studio album by English band The Fall, released on 28 July 2017 by Cherry Red Records.

This is the first album since Are You Are Missing Winner (2001) not to feature keyboardist Elena Poulou, who quit the Fall the previous year after separating from frontman Mark E. Smith, thus reducing the band to a quartet for the first time since the early 1990s. Smith died in January 2018, and no new or archival recording have since been issued as of late 2021, making New Facts Emerge the band's probable final album. 

The title of the song "Victoria Train Station Massacre" caused controversy, as the album announcement came just a week after the Ariana Grande concert bombing, which occurred in a foyer connecting Manchester Arena to Manchester Victoria railway station. A representative for the band confirmed that the track's title was an unfortunate coincidence, and the artwork was sent off for manufacture "long before the terrible events in Manchester".

Track listing

Personnel
The Fall
 Mark E. Smith – vocals, production
 Peter Greenway – guitar, synth, backing vocals
 David Spurr – bass guitar, Mellotron, backing vocals
 Keiron Melling – drums, piano, production

Additional personnel
 Pamela Vander – percussion and backing vocals on "Groundsboy", artwork
 Christophe Bride – French voice on "New Facts Emerge"
 Mat Arnold – engineering
 Simon "Ding" Archer – engineering
 Andy Pearce – mastering
 Matt Wortham – assistant mastering

Charts

References

2017 albums
The Fall (band) albums
Cherry Red Records albums